The Logan County Courthouse in Sterling, Colorado was built in 1910. It was listed on the National Register of Historic Places in 1979.

It was designed by architect John J. Huddart in Classical Revival style.

Its central rotunda area was restored in 1984.

The building houses a collection of paintings by local artist Eugene Carara and also framed original linen blueprints by architect Huddart.

It is also a contributing building in the Downtown Sterling Historic District.

References

External links

Buildings and structures in Sterling, Colorado
County courthouses in Colorado
National Register of Historic Places in Logan County, Colorado
Neoclassical architecture in Colorado
Government buildings completed in 1910